WENJ (97.3 FM) is a radio station that airs a sports radio format, licensed to Millville. Its transmitter is located in Corbin City, New Jersey, where it shares a tower with WRTQ. The station is affiliated with ESPN Radio. Its studios are in Northfield, New Jersey.

History
WENJ first signed on February 2, 1962 as WMVB-FM, an FM sister station to WMVB (1440), airing an easy listening format; through the 1970s, the station began to evolve to an adult contemporary format. In 1988 the station changed their call letters to WBSS a.k.a. "The New Boss 97 FM Stopless Music...For Shore!" and become South Jersey's 1st ever CHR station. In 1995, WBSS was sold to the owners of WKXW (101.5), which switched the station to a simulcast of WKXW's news/talk and oldies format, with a small amount of local news.

On March 15, 2002, WBSS dropped the simulcast of WKXW in favor of a modern adult contemporary format, with a call change to WIXM (referring to the station's branding of "Mix 97.3") following a few weeks later.

In November 2004, in the wake of sister station WSJO debuting a hot adult contemporary format, WIXM reverted to the WKXW simulcast; two years later, the station was renamed to WXKW.

In May 2009, WKXW began to remove references to having a simulcast partner for South Jersey from its promotions, indicating a planned format change for WXKW; on June 1, the station switched to ESPN Radio as WENJ-FM. The sports format had previously been heard in the market on WENJ, which switched to ESPN Deportes Radio after a brief period of simulcasting. The station simulcast again on that station from January 2, 2011 to October 15, 2012.

On October 31, 2012, the station dropped the -FM suffix.

On May 23, 2019, Townsquare Media launched Rock 104.1 on WENJ-HD4 and on simulcast translator W281BH in Atlantic City broadcasting a classic rock format.

Programming
The station’s flagship show, The Sports Bash, airs on weekday afternoons from 2pm-6pm ET, hosted by Mike Gill. Other local programming includes a locally-produced weeknight version of GameNight and the Saturday shows Rack and Finn Radio and The Locker Room. The station also carries Sunday morning programming from CBS Sports Radio (hosted by Carl Dukes).

Play-by-play sports
As of 2022, the station carries Philadelphia Eagles, Flyers and 76ers games and ESPN Radio's college football, MLB (including Phillies games), NFL (in select weeks) and NBA coverage. 

The station also carries game coverage from other networks, including Compass Media, Sports USA, Touchdown Radio and Westwood One, mainly college football and NFL coverage, on a week-by-week rotational basis for select games (e.g. Sunday afternoon NFL games other than Eagles games).

Translators 
The following three translators simulcast the programming of WENJ, WENJ-HD2, or HD4

References

External links
WENJ official website

ENJ
Sports radio stations in the United States
ESPN Radio stations
Radio stations established in 1962
Townsquare Media radio stations